Rodney Houison (born ), is a British musician, producer, and sound engineer who has worked with The Who, Pete Townshend, Cliff Richard, Shakin' Stevens, Judge Dread, and Echo & the Bunnymen.

He has also worked with, and is married to, Miriam Stockley. Since Stockley joined the world/new age musical group, Aomusic, Houison contributes as co-engineer.

Houison and Stockley have two children, Carly Houison and Leigh Brandon Houison. They reside in Orlando, Florida, United States.

References

External links

English male singers
English record producers
Living people
Year of birth missing (living people)